Janta TV is a Hindi-language 24/7 news television channel, owned by Haribhoomi Limited.
Janta TV now free to air from Intelsat 20 satellite. It is a free to air channel. Sparsh Sharma is the Delhi Reporter of Janta TV since 2017.

References

Hindi-language television channels in India
Television channels and stations established in 2011
Hindi-language television stations
Television stations in New Delhi
2011 establishments in India